James William Baker (15 November 1891 – 13 December 1966) was a professional footballer most notable for being the first captain of Leeds United  He was the brother of Alf Baker who played for Arsenal. Another brother Aaron Baker also played football professionally and briefly played for Leeds.

Jim was born in Ilkeston and started his career at Hartlepool United, and played at Portsmouth before moving to Huddersfield Town, where he played under future Leeds manager Arthur Fairclough. When Fairclough moved to the newly formed Leeds United F.C. to become its first manager, Jim followed him and was handed the captain's armband to command from the center of defence. Jim played for six seasons at Elland Road being captain for the whole period, and even helped Fairclough guide the team to their first silverware and Second Division championship in 1923–24, being a rock at the heart of the Leeds defence along with Ernie Hart. Jim left Leeds after two seasons of just surviving in the First Division at the end of the 1925–26 season, moving to Nelson.

He served on the Board of Directors for Leeds United between 1959 and 1961.

References

Leeds United F.C. players
Hartlepool United F.C. players
Portsmouth F.C. players
Huddersfield Town A.F.C. players
Nelson F.C. players
English Football League players
1891 births
1966 deaths
People from Ilkeston
Footballers from Derbyshire
Association football defenders
English footballers